Encarnación "Encarna" Granados Aguilera (born 30 January 1972 in Girona, Catalonia) is a Spanish race walker, who won the bronze medal over 10 km at the 1993 World Championships in Stuttgart.

Achievements

References
 
 

1972 births
Living people
Spanish female racewalkers
Athletes from Catalonia
Athletes (track and field) at the 1992 Summer Olympics
Athletes (track and field) at the 1996 Summer Olympics
Athletes (track and field) at the 2000 Summer Olympics
Olympic athletes of Spain
World Athletics Championships medalists
Sportswomen from Catalonia
Sportspeople from Girona
20th-century Spanish women
21st-century Spanish women